Myriam Laplante (born 1954) is a Canadian artist. Laplante studied visual arts and linguistics at the University of Ottawa.

Her work is included in the collections of the Musée national des beaux-arts du Québec, National Gallery of Canada, the Museum of New Zealand and the Asia Art Archive.

References

20th-century Canadian women artists
21st-century Canadian women artists
1954 births
Living people
20th-century Canadian photographers
21st-century Canadian photographers
Canadian women photographers
University of Ottawa alumni
20th-century women photographers
21st-century women photographers